Morgan Hentzen (born February 1, 1985) is a female freestyle swimmer from the United States, who won the gold medal in the women's 800m Freestyle at the 2003 Pan American Games.

References
 Profile at gostanford.cstv.com
 

1985 births
Living people
American female freestyle swimmers
Stanford Cardinal women's swimmers
Swimmers at the 2003 Pan American Games
Place of birth missing (living people)
Pan American Games gold medalists for the United States
Pan American Games silver medalists for the United States
People from La Habra Heights, California
Pan American Games medalists in swimming
Medalists at the 2003 Pan American Games